The Mobile Diabetes Screening Initiative (MDSi) is a diabetes screening program based at the University of Alberta, Edmonton, Alberta, Canada, and is part of the BRAID Diabetes Research Group.  MDSi has a field team of health professionals, which travels to remote and rural communities in Alberta, particularly off-reserve Aboriginal Communities (including the eight incorporated Métis Settlements in Alberta) to carry out diabetes and cardiovascular screening.

Little is known about diabetes and Métis people. MDSi is collecting the first clinical data on Alberta's Métis population. So far, MDSi has tested 25% of Métis people living in the eight Métis Settlements.

MDSi began operations in 2003.  The program is funded by Alberta Health and Wellness as part of Alberta's 10-year Diabetes Strategy (2003–2013).

External links
 BRAID Diabetes Research Group web site.
 University of Alberta web site

Diabetes organizations
University of Alberta
Medical and health organizations based in Alberta
Métis in Alberta
Indigenous health in Canada